The 1998 season was the Hawthorn Football Club's 74th season in the Australian Football League and 97th overall.

Fixture

Premiership season

Ladder

References

Hawthorn Football Club seasons